The Girl Cat is a 1953 Argentine film directed by Román Viñoly Barreto.

Cast
 Adrianita as Nonó
 Adolfo Stray as Samuel Gorenstein
 Enrique Chaico as Padre de Nonó
 Hugo Lanzillotta as Daniel
 Beba Bidart as Olga
 Ernesto Bianco as Sr. Salas
 Susana Campos as María Elena
 Luis Mora as Sr. Campos
 Alberto Barcel as Sacerdote
 Fausto Padín as Chofer
 Luis de Lucía
 Carlos Cotto as Reducidor
 María Ferez
 Fernando Campos
 Adolfo Meyer
 Sergio Malbrán as Empleado en joyería
 Carlos Morasano as Portero

External links
 

1953 films
1950s Spanish-language films
Argentine black-and-white films
Films directed by Román Viñoly Barreto
Argentine comedy films
1953 comedy films
1950s Argentine films